The 2019–20 season was Everton's 117th (an English record) and 66th consecutive season in the top flight of English football. They participated in the Premier League, the FA Cup and the EFL Cup. The season covered the period from 1 July 2019 to 26 July 2020.

Marco Silva started as manager one year into a three-year contract. Silva was sacked on 5 December 2019, after a 5–2 defeat to city rivals Liverpool which left the team in 18th place. Duncan Ferguson was named as caretaker manager. In Ferguson's first game in charge two days later, Everton beat Chelsea 3–1 to lift themselves out of the relegation zone. Following the appointment of Carlo Ancelotti as the new manager later that month, Ferguson was made assistant manager.

Transfers

Transfers in

Loans in

Loans out

Transfers out

Pre-season
On 12 June 2019, Everton announced their pre-season fixtures. They also competed in the 2019 edition of the Opel Cup.

Competitions

Premier League

League table

Results summary

Results by matchday

Matches
On 13 June 2019, the Premier League fixtures were announced.

FA Cup

The third round draw was made live on BBC Two from Etihad Stadium, Micah Richards and Tony Adams conducted the draw.

EFL Cup

Everton joined the competition in the second round and were drawn away to Lincoln City. They successfully advanced to the third round following a 4–2 win over Lincoln City and were subsequently drawn in the third round away to Sheffield Wednesday. The draw for the fourth round was made on 25 September 2019. The quarter-final draw was conducted on 31 October, live on BBC Radio 2.

Players

First team squad

Other players under contract

Out on loan

Squad statistics

Appearances and goals

|-
! colspan=14 style=background:#dcdcdc; text-align:center| Goalkeepers

|-
! colspan=14 style=background:#dcdcdc; text-align:center| Defenders

|-
! colspan=14 style=background:#dcdcdc; text-align:center| Midfielders

|-
! colspan=14 style=background:#dcdcdc; text-align:center| Forwards

|-
! colspan=14 style=background:#dcdcdc; text-align:center| Players transferred/loaned out during the season

Goalscorers

{| class="wikitable" style="text-align:center;"
|-
!"width:35px;"|
!"width:35px;"|
!"width:35px;"|
!"width:200px;"|Player
!"width:75px;"|Premier League
!"width:75px;"|FA Cup
!"width:75px;"|League Cup
!"width:75px;"|Total
|-
|rowspan=2| 1 || FW || 7 || align=left|  || 13 || 0 || 2 || 15
|-
| FW || 9 || align=left|  || 13 || 0 || 2 || 15
|-
|rowspan=2| 3 || MF || 10 || align=left|  || 2 || 0 || 1 || 3
|-
| MF || 20 || align=left|  || 3 || 0 || 0 || 3
|-
|rowspan=6| 5 || DF || 5 || align=left|  || 2 || 0 || 0 || 2
|-
| FW || 11 || align=left|  || 2 || 0 || 0 || 2
|-
| DF || 13 || align=left|  || 2 || 0 || 0 || 2
|-
| FW || 17 || align=left|  || 1 || 0 || 1 || 2
|-
| MF || 26 || align=left|  || 1 || 0 || 1 || 2
|-
| FW || 27 || align=left|  || 2 || 0 || 0 || 2
|-
|rowspan=4| 11 || DF || 2 || align=left|  || 0 || 0 || 1 || 1
|-
| DF || 3 || align=left|  || 0 || 0 || 1 || 1
|-
| DF || 12 || align=left|  || 0 || 0 || 1 || 1
|-
| FW || 14 || align=left|  || 1 || 0 || 0 || 1
|-
!colspan="4"|Total || 42 || 0 || 10 || 52
|-

Assists

{| class="wikitable" style="text-align:center;"
|-
!"width:35px;"|
!"width:35px;"|
!"width:35px;"|
!"width:200px;"|Player
!"width:75px;"|Premier League
!"width:75px;"|FA Cup
!"width:75px;"|League Cup
!"width:75px;"|Total
|-
|rowspan=1| 1 || DF || 12 || align=left|  || 7 || 0 || 1 || 8
|-
|rowspan=1| 2 || DF || 19 || align=left|  || 4 || 0 || 1 || 5 
|-
|rowspan=2| 3 || FW || 7 || align=left|  || 3 || 0 || 1 || 4
|-
| FW || 11 || align=left|  || 3 || 0 || 1 || 4
|-
|rowspan=3| 5 || DF || 2 || align=left|  || 3 || 0 || 0 || 3
|-
| MF || 10 || align=left|  || 3 || 0 || 0 || 3
|-
| FW || 14 || align=left|  || 0 || 0 || 3 || 3
|-
|rowspan=2| 8 || MF || 20 || align=left|  || 2 || 0 || 0 || 2
|-
| FW || 27 || align=left|  || 2 || 0 || 0 || 2
|-
|rowspan=6| 10 || FW || 9 || align=left|  || 1 || 0 || 0 || 1
|-
| DF || 13 || align=left|  || 1 || 0 || 0 || 1
|-
| FW || 17 || align=left|  || 0 || 0 || 1 || 1
|-
| MF || 21 || align=left|  || 1 || 0 || 0 || 1
|-
| DF || 23 || align=left|  || 1 || 0 || 0 || 1
|-
| FW || 42 || align=left|  || 1 || 0 || 0 || 1
|-
!colspan="4"|Total || 32 || 0 || 8 || 40
|-

Disciplinary record

{|class="wikitable" style="text-align: center;"
|-
!rowspan="2" style="width:50px;"|Rank
!rowspan="2" style="width:50px;"|Position
!rowspan="2" style="width:180px;"|Name
!colspan="2"|Premier League
!colspan="2"|FA Cup
!colspan="2"|League Cup
!colspan="2"|Total
|-
!style="width:30px;"|
!style="width:30px;"|
!style="width:30px;"|
!style="width:30px;"|
!style="width:30px;"|
!style="width:30px;"|
!style="width:30px;"|
!style="width:30px;"|
|-
|rowspan=2| 1 || FW ||align=left| Richarlison

| 8 || 0

| 0 || 0

| 1 || 0

! 9 !! 0
|-
| FW ||align=left| Dominic Calvert-Lewin

| 9 || 0

| 0 || 0

| 0 || 0

! 9 !! 0
|-
|rowspan=1| 3 || MF ||align=left| Tom Davies

| 8 || 0

| 0 || 0

| 0 || 0

! 8 !! 0
|-
|rowspan=1| 4 || DF ||align=left| Lucas Digne

| 6 || 0

| 1 || 0

| 0 || 0

! 7 !! 0
|-
|rowspan=3| 5 || MF ||align=left| Fabian Delph

| 4 || 1

| 0 || 0

| 1 || 0

! 5 !! 1
|-
| MF ||align=left| Morgan Schneiderlin

| 5 || 1

| 0 || 0

| 0 || 0

! 5 !! 1
|-
| MF ||align=left| André Gomes

| 6 || 0

| 0 || 0

| 0 || 0

! 6 !! 0
|-
|rowspan=2| 8 || DF || align=left| Séamus Coleman

| 4 || 1

| 0 || 0

| 0 || 0

! 4 !! 1
|-
| DF ||align=left| Mason Holgate

| 5 || 0

| 0 || 0

| 0 || 0

! 5 !! 0
|-
|rowspan=1| 10 || MF ||align=left| Gylfi Sigurðsson

| 3 || 0

| 0 || 0

| 1 || 0

! 4 !! 0
|-
|rowspan=4| 11 || GK ||align=left| Jordan Pickford

| 2 || 0

| 0 || 0

| 1 || 0

! 3 !! 0
|-
| DF ||align=left| Michael Keane

| 3 || 0

| 0 || 0

| 0 || 0

! 3 !! 0
|-
| DF ||align=left| Yerry Mina

| 3 || 0

| 0 || 0

| 0 || 0

! 3 !! 0
|-
| DF ||align=left| Djibril Sidibé

| 3 || 0

| 0 || 0

| 0 || 0

! 3 !! 0
|-
|rowspan=1| 15 || MF ||align=left| Bernard

| 2 || 0

| 0 || 0

| 0 || 0

! 2 !! 0
|-
|rowspan=2| 16 || FW ||align=left| Theo Walcott

| 1 || 0

| 0 || 0

| 0 || 0

! 1 !! 0
|-
| FW ||align=left| Moise Kean

| 1 || 0

| 0 || 0

| 0 || 0

! 1 !! 0
|-
!colspan=3|Total!!65!!3!!1!!0!!4!!0!!70!!3

References

Everton
Everton F.C. seasons